Suzanne M. Rivera (born 1969) is an American bioethicist, science policy expert, and president of Macalester College. She is the first female and first Latina president in the college’s history. Rivera’s presidential Inauguration ceremony was held at Macalester on October 9, 2021. Minnesota Gov. Tim Walz proclaimed it as "Suzanne M. Rivera Day" in the state.

Previously, she was the Vice President for Research and Technology Management at Case Western Reserve University, the Vice President for Research Administration at the University of Texas Southwestern Medical Center, and the Director of Research Protections in the Office of Research Administration at University of California, Irvine.

Early life and education 
Rivera was born in Jackson Heights, Queens, New York, in 1969. She moved to Massachusetts in 1980, and attended high school at The Cambridge School of Weston. She obtained a Bachelor of Arts degree from Brown University, and was the commencement orator for the class of 1991. Immediately following her undergraduate studies, Rivera earned a Master of Social Welfare degree at the University of California, Berkeley in 1993.

Career 
Rivera competed for and was awarded a Presidential Management Internship in 1993 and used it to rotate through the Region IX offices of the U.S. Department of Health and Human Services. She then took a job in the Head Start Branch of the Department of Health and Human Services Administration for Children and Families in San Francisco, California. She moved to Irvine, California, in 1996, where she began her career in research administration and research ethics, first as a review officer in University of California, Irvine's Office of Research Administration and eventually became director of that office.

In 2003, Rivera moved to Dallas, Texas. While working at the University of Texas Southwestern Medical Center for Provost Alfred G. Gilman, she pursued a doctorate at the University of Texas at Dallas, earning her Ph.D. in Public Affairs (health policy) in 2008.

From 2011-2020, Rivera worked at Case Western Reserve University (CWRU) in Cleveland, Ohio. While serving as Vice President for Research and Technology Management, she also served on the CWRU faculty in the Departments of Bioethics and Pediatrics.

She is the Chair of the Board of Public Responsibility in Medicine & Research (PRIM&R), and is an elected Member-at-large of the American Association for the Advancement of Science's (AAAS) Social, Economic, and Political Sciences section. Previously, she was a board member for the Council on Governmental Relations (COGR) and served as an appointed member of the EPA’s Human Studies Review Board and the DHHS Secretary’s Advisory Committee on Human Research Protections.

She has done field research in Costa Rica, and has been an invited lecturer on bioethics for the Ministry of Higher Education in Havana, Cuba, and at Mbarara University of Science and Technology in Mbarara, Uganda.

Civic activities 
Rivera was a member of the American Association of Universities’ (AAU) Task Force on Strategies for Reducing Sexual Harassment and Gender Discrimination.

She served as First Vice President on the Board of Esperanza, Inc., a non-governmental organization devoted to improving educational outcomes for Cleveland’s Hispanic students, and on the governance committees for Cleveland’s Fund for Our Economic Future (FFEF) and the Cleveland Water Alliance.

She currently serves on the board of the Science Museum of Minnesota; the national board of directors of College Possible, a national college access and success nonprofit; and the National Advisory Board of TeenSharp, an organization that prepares students from historically excluded groups for success at selective colleges and universities. She is a co-founder and member of the executive council of the Liberal Arts Colleges Racial Equity Leadership Appliance (LACRELA). Minnesota Gov. Tim Walz and Lt. Gov. Peggy Flanagan named Rivera to the Executive Council for the Young Women’s Initiative of Minnesota (YWI) in January 2021.

In November 2020, Rivera offered to help cover the costs of bail if any Macalester College student was arrested during protests related to the 2020 presidential general election.

In January 2021, Rivera announced a partnership between Macalester College and the Posse Foundation to increase the numbers of Black, Indigenous and other students of color at the college.

Personal life 
Rivera's husband, Michael Householder, is a scholar of Early American Literature and author of the book Inventing Americans in the Age of Discovery: Narratives of Encounter (Ashgate, 2011).  They met at Brown University and have two children together.

Awards and honors 
 Distinguished Educator, National Council of University Research Administrators (NCURA), 2020
 Hispanic Association of Colleges and Universities' (HACU) Academia de Liderazgo, 2019
 Julia Jacobsen Distinguished Service Award, National Council of University Research Administrators (NCURA), 2018
 Diversity Leadership Award, Case Western Reserve University, 2012
 Pi Alpha Alpha (public affairs honor society), 2007
 Alumni Distinguished Service Award, Brown University, 2001

Selected publications

References 

1960 births
Living people
American people of Cuban descent
Brown University people
American academic administrators
Women heads of universities and colleges
UC Berkeley School of Social Welfare alumni